The 2014–15 Coppin State Eagles men's basketball team represented Coppin State University during the 2014–15 NCAA Division I men's basketball season. The Eagles, led by first year head coach Michael Grant, played their home games at the Physical Education Complex and were members of the Mid-Eastern Athletic Conference. They finished the season 8–23 6–10 in MEAC play to finish in a tie for ninth place. They advanced to the quarterfinals of the MEAC TOurnament where they lost to North Carolina Central.

Roster

Schedule

|-
!colspan=9 style="background:#333399; color:#CFB53B;"| Regular season

|-
!colspan=9 style="background:#333399; color:#CFB53B;"| MEAC tournament

References

Coppin State Eagles men's basketball seasons
Coppin State
Coppin
Coppin